Salongo is an album by the jazz pianist Ramsey Lewis, released in 1976 by Columbia. The album rose to No. 7 on the Billboard magazine Top Jazz Albums chart and No. 17 on the Top Soul Albums chart.

Overview
Salongo was produced by Maurice White and Charles Stepney.

Critical reception

Variety wrote: "More excellent jazz and jazz-rock from Ramsey Lewis and other fine musicians. Hear Slick, Aufu Oodu, Rubato, Brazilica, Nicole and the title tune, much with Brazilian and/or African rhythms running wild." Jason Elias of AllMusic wrote: "Those shocked or even dismayed by the lack of jazz on 1975's Don't It Feel Good would no doubt be pleasantly surprised by this. Released in 1976 and produced by Maurice White and Charles Stepney, Salongo offers a more substantial look at African and Latin styles." Elias added that "Salongo earns most of its raves by being one of the few albums of the time to sidestep commercial considerations. The effort is also one of Lewis's best at getting his eclectic nature and is more enjoyable than the better-selling Sun Goddess." Chris Albertson of Stereo Review called the album "very good" and described Lewis' performance as "sly." Albertson also stated: "Sure, Ramsey Lewis has a commercial that is, salable-sound, but it's a good one, and he still plays dynamic, funky piano. The influences here range from Sly Stone to Weather Report. This is by no means music that will live forever, but neither is it stillborn, which is more than can be said for much of what we hear today."

Track listing

Personnel
 Ramsey Lewis – piano 
 Derf Reklaw Raheem – flute, percussion, vocals
 Jimmy Bryant – clavinet
 Byron Gregory – guitar
 Ron Harris –  bass guitar
 Steve Cobb – drums, vocals
 Tang – vocals
 Ndugu Leon Chancler  - drums (on "Slick" only)
 Ernie Watts - saxophone (on "Brazilica" only)

Charts

Singles

References

 

1976 albums
Ramsey Lewis albums
Columbia Records albums
Jazz fusion albums by American artists
Albums produced by Maurice White
Albums produced by Charles Stepney
Albums recorded at Wally Heider Studios